In mathematics, the word eutactic may refer to:
Eutactic lattice
Eutactic star